Around the world, journalists who report on environmental problems such as deforestation, pollution and climate change, are forming networks and associations. The largest of these—the Society of Environmental Journalists in the United States—was formed in 1990 and has over 1400 members. Since then, journalists have formed new networks in Africa, Asia and other regions. These activities that these groups undertake include training programmes, advice to journalists, and advocacy to raise the prominence of environmental topics in the media. In Africa and Asia, these networks also act to raise funds to support better quality reporting on environmental issues. James Fahn, director of the Earth Journalism Network, notes however that donors generally seem less willing to support these journalism associations than they do environmental advocacy groups.

Networks of environment journalists are able to work in ways that would be impossible for individual reporters. The Philippine Network of Environmental Journalists has, for instance, built an SMS-based news service that connects hyperlocal reports on environmental issues and disaster events to a national audience. The project included the development of a new website and trainings held with local journalists and their audiences.

Another way that such networks have acted is to protest the dangers that environmental journalists face because their reporting challenges powerful elites.  In September 2012, the Earth Journalism Network and the Society of Environmental Journalists circulated a joint petition calling on the Cambodian government to launch a full investigation into the murder of environmental journalist Hang Serei Oudom.

Global networks and associations
Earth Journalism Network

Africa: regional and continent-wide associations
 African Federation of Science Journalists
 African Network of Environmental Journalists
 Network of Climate Journalists in the Greater Horn of Africa
 Pan-African Media Alliance on Climate Change

Africa: national associations
Benin: Association des Journalistes et Communicateurs Scientifiques du Benin
Burkina Faso: Association des Journalistes et Communicateurs scientifiques du Burkina Faso
Cameroon: SciLife—Cameroon's Association of Science Journalists and Communicators
Democratic Republic of Congo: Réseau National des Journalistes Congolais Pour l'Environnement
Ethiopia: Ethiopian Environment Journalists Association 
Mozambique: Rede de Jornalistas Ambientais de Mozambique
Niger: Association des Journalistes Scientifiques du Niger
Nigeria: Nigeria Association of Science Journalists
Rwanda: Rwanda Association of Science Journalists
Sierra Leone: Federation of Environmental Journalists in Sierra Leone
Sierra Leone: The Sierra Leone Environmental Journalists Association
Sierra Leone: Union of Environmental Journalists
South Africa: South African Science Journalists’ Association
Sudan: Sudanese Environmental Journalists Association
Sudan: Sudanese Society for Scientists and Environmental Journalists
Tanzania: Journalists Environmental Association of Tanzania
Togo: Science Journalists and Communicators of Togo
Tunisia: Tunisia Environment Reporting Network
Uganda: Uganda Science Journalists' Association
Zambia: African Network of Environmental Journalists - Zambia Chapter
Zimbabwe: Zimbabwe Environmental Journalists Association

Asia: national associations
 Indonesia: Society of Indonesian Environmental Journalists
 Pakistan: National Council of Environmental Journalists
 Pakistan: Environmental Journalists Association of Pakistan (EJAP)
 Pakistan: Pakistan Environmental Journalists
 Philippines: Philippine Network of Environmental Journalists

References

External links
Journalists & Writers Archives - Green Africa Directory

+Journ
Envir